George Ashby Bowles Sr. (May 11, 1883 – June 1, 1956) was an American Democratic politician who served as a member of the Virginia House of Delegates and as Virginia state insurance commissioner for more than 20 years.

His historic family home, The Oaks, is on the National Register of Historic Places.

References

External links 

1883 births
1956 deaths
Democratic Party members of the Virginia House of Delegates
20th-century American politicians